Hansa Bryggeri (Hansa Brewery) is the local brewery of Bergen, Norway.

It was established in 1891 by Waldemar Stoud Platou when he acquired the minor local brewery Det Sembske Bryggeri. The name "Hansa" is meant to reflect Bergen's history as one of the Hansa trading cities.

The brewery was originally situated in a part of Bergen called Kalfaret, at the foot of mount Fløyen, but relocated to an industrial area outside the city during the 1980s.

Hansa Bryggeri merged with the Østfold-based Borg Bryggerier (Borg Breweries) in 1997, which resulted in the creation of the company Hansa Borg Bryggerier.

References

External links
Hansa Borg Bryggerier

Breweries in Norway
Food and drink companies established in 1891
Manufacturing companies based in Bergen
Norwegian companies established in 1891